The Butte, Anaconda and Pacific Railway  is a short line railroad in the U.S. state of Montana which was incorporated in 1891.  It was financed by the interests behind the Anaconda Copper Mining Company and operated primarily to carry copper ore from the mines at Butte, Montana to the smelters at Anaconda, Montana, although the company was chartered as a common carrier and also carried passengers and general freight.

Early years

The BA&P was an electrification pioneer, converting in 1913 and being the first primarily freight railroad to electrify. Electrification was at 2,400 volts DC;  the work was performed by General Electric and the railroad's own staff. As described in a period article:

The electrification was abandoned in 1967 as it had become cheaper to operate diesel-electric locomotives.

Many resources of the railway were included in the Butte, Anaconda and Pacific Railway Historic District, which was listed on the National Register of Historic Places in 1988.

Business sold

The railroad as a whole lost much of its business following the closure of the Anaconda smelters, and in 1985 was sold to a consortium of local investors and reconstituted as the Rarus Railway .

Film credit
In 1985, The B.A.&P. became the backdrop of a full-length feature film called Runaway Train. The film was directed by Andrei Konchalovsky, & stars Jon Voight, who was nominated for an Academy Award & won the Golden Globe Award for Best Actor, Eric Roberts, who was nominated for an Academy Award & Golden Globe Award for Best Supporting Actor, Rebecca DeMornay, John P. Ryan, Kyle T. Heffner, Kenneth McMillan & Edward Bunker who also co-wrote the script. It was filmed on the B.A.&P. Railway & at the Roundhouse at Anaconda in March 1985. The film was also nominated for the Golden Globe Award for Best Picture - Drama.

Name change
On July 19, 2007, Patriot Rail Corporation, the parent company which acquired Rarus Railway in May 2007, announced that the railway's name was officially changed back to Butte, Anaconda and Pacific Railway.

See also 

 Milwaukee Road
 Butte Montana
 Anaconda Copper
 Boxcab

Footnotes

References

External links

Butte, Anaconda & Pacific Railway Web site

Montana railroads
Former Class I railroads in the United States
Electric railways in Montana
Patriot Rail Company
Anaconda Copper